The San Juan Kings, previously known as the San Juan Knights, are a professional basketball team representing San Juan, Metro Manila. They played in the Metropolitan Basketball Association (MBA) from 1999 to 2001, the Maharlika Pilipinas Basketball League (MPBL) since 2018, the Filbasket since 2021, and the Pilipinas Super League (PSL) since 2022. They also participated in the Chooks-to-Go Pilipinas 3x3. The team has been enjoying considerable success, winning the MBA National Championship in 2000 and the MBA first phase conference in 2001, as well as the MPBL National Championship in 2019. The Kings played their home games at the PhilSports Arena in 1999 to early 2000, the San Juan Gym in 2000, and in the Filoil EcoOil Centre since 2018.

History
The San Juan team, owned by former San Juan Mayor and Philippine senator Jinggoy Estrada and businessman Sandy Javier, was accepted in the league's second season in 1999, along with two others; Surigao and Nueva Ecija. San Juan was called Knights in reference to the concepts of gallantry and bravery. During the pre-season, the team was able to snare 6-9 man-mountain Bonel Balingit from the PBA, offering him a three-year, P16 million contract. They also acquired playmaker and last year's member of the MBA mythical five - Gherome Ejercito, who was released by the Pampanga Dragons since San Juan was owned by Gherome's cousin Jinggoy Estrada. The other Knights includes Christian Calaguio, 1998 NCAA Most Valuable Player, and point guard Chito Victolero.

In April 2018, San Juan Knights returned to competitive basketball when it joined the Maharlika Pilipinas Basketball League, a then-newly established regional basketball league. In addition, the Knights was also known as San Juan Knights-Go for Gold powered by Big J Sports due to their sponsorship with Powerball Marketing & Logistics Corporation and its Go for Gold program along with Big J Sports; Big J was also sponsored another MPBL team, Navotas Clutch, with PMLC also already owns the Go for Gold Scratchers basketball team in the PBA Developmental League.

Metropolitan Basketball Association (MBA)

MBA national championship
In the MBA's third season in 2000, the San Juan Knights captured the national title, they swept Laguna Lakers in the best-of-three semifinals and scored a 3–1 series victory over Manila Metrostars in the Northern Conference finals. For the national championship, the Knights defeated the Negros Slashers, four games to two, in the best-of-seven series. The fifth game had a debris-throwing incident at the University of St.La Salle Coliseum in Bacolod City. The Knights were way ahead, 87–65, with 11 minutes and 38 seconds left in the fourth quarter when play was stopped. The Negros Slashers conceded Game five, giving the San Juan Knights a 3–2 edge in the series with Game six to be held at San Juan's homecourt - San Juan Coliseum.

Head coaches
 Philip Cezar

MPBL roster

Head coaches
 Randy Alcantara (2018–present)

Notable players

MBA

Randy Alcantara
Bonel Balingit
Vilmer Banares
Chris Calaguio
Danny Capobres
Gilbert Castillo
Bruce Dacia
Rudy Distrito
Gherome Ejercito
Kalani Ferreria
Philip Newton
Michael Otto
Rafi Reavis
Omanzie Rodriguez
Chito Victolero

MPBL

Mark Cardona (2018–2020)
Jam Cortes (2018–2019)
Samboy de Leon (2018)
Larry Rodriguez (2018–2021)
John Wilson (2018–2021)

Filbasket

Rhenz Abando  (2021)
Justin Gutang (2021–2022)

MPBL records

References

 
Basketball teams established in 1999
1999 establishments in the Philippines
Sports teams in Metro Manila
Maharlika Pilipinas Basketball League teams
Metropolitan Basketball Association teams